Sahara is a 1972 album by jazz pianist McCoy Tyner, his first to be released on the Milestone label. It was recorded in January 1972 and features performances by Tyner with saxophonist Sonny Fortune, bassist  Calvin Hill, and drummer Alphonse Mouzon.  The music shows African and Eastern influences and features all the musicians playing multiple instruments, with Tyner himself utilizing koto, flute, and percussion in addition to his usual piano.

Reception
The AllMusic review by Brian Olewnick states "Tyner would go on to create several fine albums in the mid-'70s, but never again would he scale quite these heights. Sahara is an astonishingly good record and belongs in every jazz fan's collection".

In addition to its critical praise, the album is also considered Tyner's commercial breakthrough; it sold over 100,000 copies and was nominated for two Grammys.

Track listing
All compositions by McCoy Tyner

 "Ebony Queen" — 9:00
 "A Prayer for My Family" — 4:48
 "Valley of Life" — 5:19
 "Rebirth" — 5:20
 "Sahara" — 23:27

Personnel
McCoy Tyner - piano, koto (3), percussion (5), flute (5)
Sonny Fortune - alto saxophone (4), soprano saxophone (1, 5), flute (3, 5)
Calvin Hill - bass, reeds (3, 5), percussion (3, 5)
Alphonse Mouzon - drums, trumpet (5), reeds (5), percussion (3, 5)

References

McCoy Tyner albums
1972 albums
Milestone Records albums
Albums produced by Orrin Keepnews